The Chilean Matorral (NT1201) is a terrestrial ecoregion of central Chile, located on the west coast of South America. It is in the Mediterranean forests, woodlands, and scrub biome, part of the Neotropical realm.

Matorral is typically characterized by a temperate Mediterranean climate, with rainy winters and dry summers. It is one of the world's five Mediterranean climate regions, which are all located in the middle latitudes on the west coast of continents. The Mediterranean Basin, the California chaparral and woodlands ecoregion of California and Baja California, the Cape Province of South Africa, and Southwest Australia are the other Mediterranean-climate regions.

Setting
The Matorral occupies central Chile between 32° and 37° south latitude. The Pacific Ocean lies to the west, and the Chilean Coastal Range lies parallel to the coast. The Chilean Central Valley lies between the Coastal range and the Andes Mountains, which bound the Matorral ecoregion on the east. To the north is the extremely dry Atacama desert, which separates the Matorral from the tropical forests of northern South America. A semi-desert region known as El Norte Chico (the "little north") lies between 28° and 32° south latitude, and is the transition zone between the Atacama desert and the Matorral. To the south lies the cooler and wetter Valdivian temperate rain forests ecoregion, which includes most of South America's temperate rain forests.

Flora
The Chilean Matorral ecoregion is home to several plant communities.
Coastal Matorral is a low, soft scrubland which extends from La Serena in the north to Valparaiso in the south. Typical species are the coastal daisy (Bahia ambrosioides), Palhuén (Adesmia microphylla), and Palo de Yagua, the wild coastal fuchsia (Fuchsia lycioides). The coastal matorral is similar to the garrigue of the Mediterranean Basin and the coastal sage scrub of southern California.
Matorral is a shrubland plant community, composed of sclerophyll ("hard-leaved") shrubs and small trees, cactus, and bromeliads. Typical species include Litre (Lithraea venenosa), Quillay or Soapbark Tree (Quillaja saponaria), cactus (Echinopsis chiloensis), and bromeliads of genus Puya, with a diverse understory of herbs, vines, and geophytes. The matorral is similar to the chaparral of California and the maquis of the Mediterranean Basin.
Espinal is a savanna plant community, composed of widely spaced clumps of trees, predominantly Espino (Acacia caven) and spiny carob tree (Prosopis chilensis), with an understory of annual grasses introduced from the Mediterranean Basin in the 16th century. Much of the espinal was formerly matorral, degraded over the centuries by intensive grazing of sheep, goats, and cattle.
Sclerophyll woodlands and forests were once more extensive, but now exist in small patches in the coast ranges and Andean foothills. The sclerophyll forests and woodlands are composed predominantly of evergreen sclerophyll trees, including Peumo (Cryptocarya alba), Boldo (Peumus boldus), Mayten (Maytenus boaria), and Chilean wine palm (Jubaea chilensis).

The ecoregion has many endemic plant species, with affinities to the South American tropics, the Antarctic flora, and the Andes. About 95% of the plant species are endemic to Chile, including Gomortega keule, Pitavia punctata, Nothofagus alessandrii, and the Chilean Wine Palm, Jubaea chilensis.

Conservation
The Matorral contains the majority of Chile's population and largest cities. The Central valley is Chile's main agricultural region, and the region is also subject to extensive grazing, logging, and urbanization. Of Chile's ecoregions, the Matorral is the least protected by national parks and preserves. Only 1.3% of the ecoregion is protected. Protected areas include:
 Lago Peñuelas Forest Reserve
 Río Blanco Forest Reserve
 Las Cruces Marine and Coastal Protected Area
 Bosque de Fray Jorge National Park
 Las Palmas de Cocalán National Park
 Llanos de Challe National Park
 Pan de Azúcar National Park
 Morro Moreno National Park
 Las Chinchillas National Reserve
 Pingüino de Humboldt National Reserve
 El Yali National Reserve
 Roblería del Cobre de Loncha National Reserve
 Pichasca Natural Monument
 Cerro Ñielol Natural Monument
 Isla Cachagua Natural Monument
 Paposo Norte Natural Monument
 Roca Oceánica	Nature Sanctuary
 Campo dunar de la punta de Concón Nature Sanctuary
 Palmar El Salto Nature Sanctuary
 Las Petras de Quintero y su Entorno Nature Sanctuary
 Laguna El Peral Nature Sanctuary
 Laguna Conchalí Nature Sanctuary
 Granito Orbicular Nature Sanctuary
 Serranía el Ciprés Nature Sanctuary
 Acantilados Federico Santa María Nature Sanctuary
 Isla de Cachagua Nature Sanctuary
 Predio Sector "Altos de Cantillana - Horcón de Piedra y Roblería Cajón de Lisboa" Nature Sanctuary
 San Juan de Piche Nature Sanctuary
 Bosque de Calabacillo de Navidad Nature Sanctuary
 Horcón de Piedra (Fundo Rinconada de Chocalán) Nature Sanctuary
 Cajón del Río Achibueno Nature Sanctuary
 Estero Derecho Nature Sanctuary
 Humedal de Tunquén Nature Sanctuary
 Quebrada de La Plata Nature Sanctuary
 Quebrada de Córdova Nature Sanctuary
 Quebrada Llau Llau Nature Sanctuary
 Área de Palma Chilena de Monte Aranda Nature Sanctuary
 Cerro Poqui Nature Sanctuary
 Raja de Manquehua - Poza Azul Nature Sanctuary
 Humedales de Tongoy Nature Sanctuary
 Humedal Río Maipo Nature Sanctuary
 Cerro Santa Inés Nature Sanctuary
 El Zaino - Laguna El Copín Nature Sanctuary
 Humedal Costero Carrizal Bajo Nature Sanctuary

External links

References

 
Ecoregions of Chile
 
Mediterranean forests, woodlands, and scrub
Neotropical ecoregions
Sclerophyll forests